Luka Tembo (born 25 September 1989) is a Zambian football defender.

References

1989 births
Living people
Zambian footballers
Zambia international footballers
Lusaka Dynamos F.C. players
Zanaco F.C. players
Kabwe Warriors F.C. players
Nakambala Leopards F.C. players
Association football defenders